The list of Wikipedia people includes notable editors, founders, and functionaries of the online encyclopedia Wikipedia.



By surname

A
 Evan Amos, a New York City-based professional photographer known for his numerous stock images of video game consoles, which are frequently used in Wikipedia articles
 Amin Azzam, an American psychiatrist and clinical professor at the UCSF School of Medicine known for teaching a class of medical students which consists entirely of editing Wikipedia articles

B
Nicholson Baker is an author and conservationist who "fell in love with Wikipedia".
 Mark Bernstein, a Russian Wikipedia editor, blogger
 Yaroslav Blanter, a Russian nanoscientist who specializes in editing Russian-language pages

C

 Hampton Catlin, an American computer programmer and programming language inventor who wrote several applications for iOS and other mobile platforms, including a Wikipedia browsing client which was later purchased by the Wikimedia Foundation. Catlin was later hired by Wikimedia Foundation as Mobile development lead.
 Faizul Latif Chowdhury, Bangladeshi economist and writer who uses his real name to edit Wikipedia, primarily the Bengali-language edition
 William Connolley, a climate modeller who edits Wikipedia using his real name, William M. Connolley
 Danese Cooper, an American programmer, computer scientist and advocate of open source software who worked with Wikimedia foundation as Chief Technical Officer.
 Lee Daniel Crocker, an American programmer best known for rewriting MediaWiki, the content-management software upon which Wikipedia and many other websites run, to address scalability problems.
 Anthony Czarnik, American biochemist, inventor, and professor.

D
 Florence Devouard, a French Wikipedian and former Chair of the Board of Trustees of the Wikimedia Foundation
 Mike Dickison, New Zealand's first "Wikipedian-at-large"

E

 Siân Evans, a librarian, activist, and co-founder of Art+Feminism, a global campaign that challenges gender bias on Wikipedia

F
 Farhad Fatkullin, linguist known for work on development of Wikipedias in languages of Russia

G
 Tomasz Ganicz, former president of Wikimedia Polska (2007–2018)
 Sue Gardner, former executive director, Wikimedia Foundation (2007–2014)
 Susan Gerbic, founder and leader of the Guerrilla Skepticism on Wikipedia (GSoW) project
 Mike Godwin, former general counsel for the Wikimedia Foundation (2007–2010)

H

 Martin Haase, a German  linguistics professor at the University of Bamberg as well as a linguist, polyglot, and podcaster who is also a Wikipedia volunteer and served as a member of Wikimedia Germany's advisory board (2005–2007)
 Aaron Halfaker, a former research scientist at the Wikimedia Foundation
 James Heilman, a Canadian emergency department physician, Wikipedian, and advocate for the improvement of Wikipedia's health-related content
 Miran Hladnik, Slovene literary historian

I

 Maryana Iskander, chief executive officer of the Wikimedia Foundation (2022–present)

J
 Andrea James, transgender activist
 Dariusz Jemielniak, professor of management
 Richard J. Jensen, professor and historian

K

 Uładzimir Katkoŭski, a Belarusian blogger, web designer and website creator who was a founder of Belarusian Wikipedia
 Rauan Kenzhekhanuly, a Kazakh entrepreneur and NGO activist who was named the first Wikipedian of the Year in August 2011 by Wikipedia co-founder Jimmy Wales at Wikimania
 Bassel Khartabil, a Palestinian Syrian open-source software developer who contributed to projects like Creative Commons, Wikipedia, and Mozilla Firefox. On 15 March 2012, the one-year anniversary of the Syrian uprising, he was detained by the Syrian government at Adra Prison in Damascus. Khartabil was executed by the Syrian regime shortly after his disappearance in 2015.
 Justin Knapp, an American Wikipedian who in 2012 became the first person to make 1 million Wikipedia edits
 Dan Koehl, pioneer and first admin on Swedish Wikipedia and prolific contributor to different Wikimedia projects
 Ihor Kostenko, a Ukrainian journalist, student activist and Wikipedian killed during the Euromaidan events

L

 Andrew Lih, an American new media researcher, consultant and writer, as well as an authority on internet censorship in the People's Republic of China and a long-time Wikipedian

M

 Katherine Maher, executive director of the Wikimedia Foundation (2016–2021)
 Michael Mandiberg, co-founder of the Art+Feminism project
 Magnus Manske, developer of MediaWiki and related software tools
 Ira Brad Matetsky, American lawyer
 Rémi Mathis, historian and curator, Wikipedian of the year (2013), author of Wikipédia. Dans les coulisses de la plus grande encyclopédie du monde (2021)
 Emna Mizouni, Wikipedian of the year, 2019
 Erik Möller, former deputy director of Wikimedia Foundation (2008–2015)
 Jason Moore, editor and organizer

N

 Felix Nartey, a Ghanaian social entrepreneur and open advocate who was named the Wikimedian of the Year in August 2017 by Wikipedia co-founder Jimmy Wales at Wikimania
 Alaa Najjar, a physician Wikipedian and internet activist who was named the Wikimedian of the Year at Wikimania in August 2021 for his pioneering role in the development of the Arab and medical communities, as well as for his role in the development of COVID-19 topics

O
 Tron Øgrim, a Norwegian journalist, author and politician. He was active in Socialist Youth Union (later Red Youth) from 1965  to 1973, and a central figure in the Workers' Communist Party from 1973 to 1984. From 2005 till his death in 2007, he contributed to Wikipedia both online and offline.

P

 Pavel Pernikaŭ, a Belarusian Wikipedia editor and human rights activist
 Tobias Preis, professor of social science
 Steven Pruitt, highest edit count on the English Wikipedia
 Simon Pulsifer, prolific Wikipedia contributor

R
 Steven Rubenstein, anthropologist

S
 Larry Sanger, co-founder of Wikipedia
 Tony Santiago, editor recognized in 2007 by the 23rd Senate of Puerto Rico for his contributions to Puerto Rico–related content
 Seedfeeder, explicit illustrator
 María Sefidari, chair of Wikimedia Foundation's Board of Trustees (2018–2021)
 David Shankbone, photographer and blogger
Revo Soekatno, linguistic researcher and co-founder of Wikimedia Indonesia
 Jan Sokol, a Czech philosopher, university professor and promoter of WMCZ project Senior Citizens Write Wikipedia
 Rosie Stephenson-Goodknight, joint Wikimedian of the Year (2016)
 Aaron Swartz, programmer and political activist

T

Audrey Tang, a Taiwanese programmer and politician.
 Sandister Tei, Wikimedian of the Year (2020) and co-founder of Wikimedia Ghana User Group
 Emily Temple-Wood, joint Wikipedian of the Year (2016)
 Lila Tretikov, former executive director of the Wikimedia Foundation (2014–2016)

V
 Volodymyr Vakulenko
 Oscar van Dillen, first chairperson of the Dutch chapter of the Wikimedia Foundation
 Luis Villa, an American attorney and programmer who worked for the Wikimedia Foundation

W

 Jess Wade, physicist who has written over 1700 articles about women in STEM
 Adrianne Wadewitz (1977–2014), an American Wikipedian and scholar of 18th-century British literature
 Jimmy Wales, co-founder of Wikipedia
 Maia Weinstock, science journalist and gender equality activist
 Molly White, Wikipedia editor, cryptocurrency skeptic, and author of the site Web3 Is Going Just Great

Y
 Taha Yasseri,  associate professor of sociology at University College Dublin, Ireland

See also
 List of people imprisoned for editing Wikipedia
 Wikipedia community

References

Lists about Wikipedia
Wikipedia People